Gwyn or Gwynn may refer to:

People
 Gwyn (name), includes a list of people with the given name or surname Gwyn, including variants such as Gwynn and Gwynne

Fictional or mythological characters
 Gwyn ap Nudd, in Welsh mythology
 Gwynn (Sluggy Freelance), a character in the webcomic
 Gwyn, Lord of Cinder, a character in the video game Dark Souls
 Gwyn, nickname of Gwyndala, a character in the animated television series Star Trek: Prodigy

Places in the United States
 Gwynn, Virginia
 Gwynn's Island, Virginia

See also
 Gwynn Park High School, Maryland
 St Richard Gwyn Roman Catholic High School (disambiguation)
 Nell Gwyn (disambiguation)
 Ty Gwyn (disambiguation)
 Gwin (disambiguation)
 Gwynne (disambiguation)